Ahmednagar College was founded in 1947 by B. P. Hivale with the support and co-operation of the American Marathi Mission, Bombay, the American Board of Commissioners for Foreign Missions, Boston, Minneapolis, Minnesota, William H. Danforth of St. Louis, Missouri, and a number of other individual friends and groups.

Universities and colleges in Maharashtra
Education in Ahmednagar district
Colleges affiliated to Savitribai Phule Pune University
Educational institutions established in 1947
1947 establishments in India